Svetlana Zilberman (née Beliasova, born 10 May 1958) is an Israeli badminton player. In 1986, she won a bronze medal at the European Badminton Championships in women's singles event. She also won the Israeli National Badminton Championships 17 times in the women's singles and doubles event, and 21 times in the mixed doubles event.

Achievements

European Championships 
Women's singles

BWF International (3 titles, 1 runner-up) 
Mixed doubles

  BWF International Challenge tournament
  BWF International Series tournament
  BWF Future Series tournament

IBF International 
Women's singles

Women's doubles

Mixed doubles

Personal life 
Her son Misha Zilberman is also a badminton player. He competed at the 2012, 2016 and  2020 Summer Olympics.

References

External links
 

1958 births
Living people
Belarusian female badminton players
Soviet female badminton players
Israeli female badminton players
Badminton players at the 2019 European Games
European Games competitors for Israel